Jones v. United States may refer to:

United States Supreme Court cases:
 Jones v. United States (1849), 48 U.S. 681 (1849)
 Jones v. United States (1890), 137 U.S. 202 (1890), interpreting Guano Islands Act's stated criminal jurisdiction as constitutional 
 Jones v. United States (1958), 357 U.S. 493 (1958)
 Jones v. United States (1960), 362 U.S. 257 (1960)
 Jones v. United States (1983), 463 U.S. 354 (1983), on defendants who were found not guilty by reason of insanity
 Jones v. United States (1999), 526 U.S. 227 (1999), interpreting the federal carjacking statute
 Jones v. United States (2000), 529 U.S. 848 (2000)

See also
 United States v. Jones (disambiguation)
 Lists of United States Supreme Court cases
 Lists of United States Supreme Court cases by volume

United States Supreme Court cases